Novobashirovo (Yañı Bäşir) is a rural locality (a village) in Chekmagushevsky District, Bashkortostan, Russia. The population was 26 as of 2010. There is 1 street.

Geography 
Novobashirovo is located 29 km east of Chekmagush (the district's administrative centre) by road. Starobashirovo is the nearest rural locality.

References 

Rural localities in Chekmagushevsky District